

Events

January
 January
 Unable to keep his promises to shareholders, Robert Ralph Young suspends dividends on New York Central stock, a factor in his subsequent suicide on January 25.
 Last steam locomotive operated by Nederlandse Spoorwegen.
 January 1 – The Chicago & North Western Railway acquires the Litchfield and Madison Railway.

February
 February 4 – Canada's Kellog Commission releases a report on the use of firemen as part of diesel locomotive crews.
 February – The Alaska Railroad sells six ex-USATC S160 Class 2-8-0 locomotives to the standard gauge Ferrocarril de Langreo in northern Spain, where they are used on a new diversion built to avoid a cable railway. This will be the third Transatlantic crossing for #3410.

March
 March 4 – The Los Angeles Metropolitan Transit Authority begins operating the remnant passenger services of the Pacific Electric and Los Angeles Railway.
 March 13 – Queensland BB18¼ class locomotive No. 1089, completed by Walkers, Maryborough, Queensland, is the last main-line steam locomotive built in Australia.

April
 April 20 – The Key System discontinues streetcar service.
 April 26
 Last day of regularly scheduled passenger service on the Maine Central Railroad Mountain Division.
 Last run of the Baltimore & Ohio Railroad's Royal Blue.

May
 May 24 – The Pacific Electric Bellflower Line, then being operated by the Los Angeles Metropolitan Transit Authority, ceases passenger operations, relegating the West Santa Ana Branch to a freight line.

June
 June 22 – The Chicago Transit Authority Congress Branch opens for service in the median of the Eisenhower Expressway, pioneering the first use of rail rapid transit and a multi-lane automobile expressway in the same grade-separated right-of-way. It replaced the 1895-built Garfield Park 'L' route and alignment from Des Plaines Avenue, Forest Park to the Loop.
 June 25 –  The Pennsylvania Railroad discontinues the Afternoon Steeler passenger train between Pittsburgh and Cleveland.

July
 July – General Motors Electro-Motive Division introduces the EMD SD24.
 July 7 – The Hudson & Manhattan Railroad reintroduces women-only cars on the railroad's commuter trains in New York City.
 July 17 – The Railway Enthusiasts Society is formed to promote rail transportation and preservation in New Zealand
 July 25 – Pacific Great Eastern Railway completes construction of the line to Fort St. John, British Columbia.

August 
 August 9 – The Moccasin, the longest running named passenger train in Canada thus far, is discontinued.

September
 September – On the Drachenfels Railway, Königswinter, Germany, a rack railway train derails, killing 17.
 September 15 – A Central Railroad of New Jersey commuter train plunges off the Newark Bay Bridge while raised for water traffic, killing 48.

October
 October – After building only 59 examples of the type, Fairbanks-Morse and Canadian Locomotive Company discontinue construction of the H-24-66 model Train Master diesel locomotive.
 October 1 – Northern Ireland's Ulster Transport Authority and the Republic of Ireland's Córas Iompair Éireann take over from the Great Northern Railway Board in running the remaining cross-border route (Dublin–Belfast) of the Irish railway system. The GNR assets are split between the two state companies.

November
 November 1 – The Strasburg Rail Road is purchased by a non-profit group.

December
 December 31 – The Harcourt Street railway line between Dublin and Bray, Ireland, closes.

Unknown date
 South African Railways takes delivery of its last steam locomotives for the  gauge, GMAM class Garratts.
 Last Garratt steam locomotive to be built in Manchester by Beyer, Peacock & Company is delivered as South African Railways NGG16 class no. 143 ( gauge).
 SNCF electrifies its Paris–Lille line in France.
 Ernest S. Marsh succeeds Fred Gurley as president of the Atchison, Topeka & Santa Fe Railway.

Accidents

Deaths

January deaths
 January 25 – Robert Ralph Young, financier and controlling stockholder of the New York Central commits suicide after suspending company dividends (born 1897)

References 
 (April 3, 2005), Significant dates in Canadian railway history. Retrieved July 22, 2005 and August 9, 2005.